Fixed-function is a term canonically used to contrast 3D graphics APIs and earlier GPUs designed prior to the advent of shader-based 3D graphics APIs and GPU architectures.

History 
Historically fixed-function APIs consisted of a set of function entry points that would approximately or directly map to dedicated logic for their named purpose in GPUs designed to support them.  As shader based GPUs and APIs evolved, fixed-function APIs were implemented by graphics driver engineers using the more general purpose shading architecture.  This approach served as a segue that would continue providing the fixed-function API abstraction most developers were experienced with while allowing further development and enhancements of the newer shader-based architectures.
 
OpenGL, OpenGL ES and DirectX (Direct3D) are all 3D graphics APIs that went through the transition from the fixed-function programming model to the shader-based programming model.  Below is a table of when the transition from fixed-function to shaders was made:

Fixed function vs shaders 
Fixed function APIs tend to be a simpler programming abstraction with a series of well-defined and specifically named graphics pipeline stages.  Shader-based APIs treat graphics data (vertices and pixels / texels) generically and allow a great deal of flexibility in how this data is modulated.  More sophisticated rendering techniques are possible using a shader-based API.

References 

3D rendering